Dean Windsor (born 9 September 1986 in Bathurst, New South Wales, Australia) is an Australian professional racing cyclist who is known internationally as a criterium rider. 
Riding on the Track as a junior Dean Windsor won the Under19 Oceania Points Race Championship at Wanganui, NZ in 2004. Then focused on Road Racing winning the National U23 Criterium Championship, in 2007 at Brisbane. Then in 2010 was runner-up in the Australian Elite Criterium Championship at Ballarat. In 2011 he was runner-up in the British Elite Circuit Series behind then Rapha Condor-Sharp Team mate Dean Downing which included a win in the Stafford GP.

Outside of racing, Windsor is a qualified primary school teacher having studied primary education at Charles Sturt University.

Career highlights

2006
3rd Stage 4 Tour of Wellington, Pahiatua (NZL) 
 2nd Stage 1 Tour of Gippsland, Mallacoota (Aus)
 3rd Stage 5 Tour of Gippsland, Metung (Aus)
 2nd Stage 6 Tour of Gippsland, Bairnsdale (Aus)
2007
 1st Stage 4 Jayco Bay Cycling Classic, Geelong (Aus)
 2nd Stage 3 Tour de Taiwan, Chiayi (TPE)
 3rd Stage 5 Tour de Taiwan, Taichung (TPE)
2008
 1st Points Jersey Classification Jayco Bay Cycling Classic,(Aus)
2009
 2nd Stage 1 Jayco Bay Cycling Classic, Williamstown (Aus)
 2nd Stage 3 Jayco Bay Cycling Classic, Geelong (Aus)
 1st Points Jersey Classification Jayco Bay Cycling Classic,(Aus)
 2nd Stage 3 Tour de Taiwan, Taichung City (TPE)
 3rd Stage 5 Tour de Taiwan, Taichung (TPE)
 6th Melle GP (Bel)
 3rd Stage 3 Tour de Hokkaido, Toyotomi (JPN)
2010
 2nd National Elite Criterium Championship, Ballarat (Aus)
 3rd Stage 7 Tour de Taiwan, Taipei (TPE)
 1st Stage 4 Irish Sea Tour of the North, Ballymena (IRL)
 2nd Shay Elliott Memorial Race (IRL)
 3rd Elite Circuit Series (GBR)
 2nd Newport Nocturne

2011
 2nd OCBC Singapore Criterium (SIN)
 3rd Stage 8 Tour of Ireland, Skerries (IRL)
 2nd Elite Circuit Series (GBR)
2012
 2nd Stage 3 Settimana internazionale di Coppi e Bartali (ITA)

References

External links
 Official Website
 Current Team WebSite
 

Australian male cyclists
Living people
1986 births
People from Bathurst, New Brunswick
Sportsmen from New South Wales
Charles Sturt University alumni